The list of shipwrecks in 1949 includes ships sunk, foundered, grounded, or otherwise lost during 1949.

January

1 January

16 January

22 January

27 January

February

3 February

9 February

13 February

22 February

March

1 March

4 March

5 March
.

6 March

25 March

28 March

30 March

31 March

April

3 April

10 April

14 April

16 April

20 April

21 April

22 April

23 April

25 April

26 April

28 April

Unknown date

May

1 May

4 May

8 May

15 May

25 May

28 May

29 May

Unknown date

June

3 June

5 June

6 June

10 June

20 June

21 June

22 June

July

1 July

3 July

11 July

14 July

29 July

30 July

31 July

Unknown date

August

8 August

11 August

14 August

17 August

23 August

26 August

31 August

September

5 September

7 September

9 September

14 September

15 September

19 September

20 September

22 September

23 September

28 September

Unknown date

October

4 October

6 October

7 October

16 October

18 October

19 October

20 October

21 October

25 October

31 October

November

2 November

9 November

13 November

18 November

19 November

22 November

27 November

December

2 December

11 December

13 December

19 December

23 December

29 December

Unknown date

References

External links
Maritimequest Shipwreck Database (Downloadable Excel file)

1949
 
Ships